Radosław Janukiewicz (born 5 May 1984) is a Polish footballer who plays as a goalkeeper for Pomorzanin Nowogard.

Club career
On 13 February 2008 Śląsk Wrocław announced that the player had signed a four-year contract with Skoda Xanthi transferring him to the Greek club at the end of the season and that he would spend the remainder of 2007–08 on loan at Zagłębie Lubin. However, the contract with Skoda was terminated before the start of the new season. On 28 February 2009 he joined GKP Gorzów Wielkopolski, signing a half-year contract.

On 31 March 2017, Janukiewicz signed for Norwegian side Strømsgodset on loan.

On 26 August 2020, he joined Pomorzanin Nowogard.

International career
Janukiewicz was called up to the Poland national football team on one occasion in 2014 for a friendly against Germany, but remained on the bench.

Notes

External links
 
 

1984 births
Sportspeople from Wrocław
Living people
Polish footballers
Association football goalkeepers
Śląsk Wrocław players
Zagłębie Lubin players
Xanthi F.C. players
Stilon Gorzów Wielkopolski players
Pogoń Szczecin players
Górnik Zabrze players
Strømsgodset Toppfotball players
Chojniczanka Chojnice players
Ekstraklasa players
I liga players
II liga players
Eliteserien players
Polish expatriate footballers
Expatriate footballers in Greece
Polish expatriate sportspeople in Greece
Expatriate footballers in Norway
Polish expatriate sportspeople in Norway